Philippe Levenard (born 9 February 1965) is a French former professional footballer who played as a defender.

References

Living people
1965 births
French footballers
Association football defenders
Ligue 1 players
Ligue 2 players
SC Bastia players
Gazélec Ajaccio players
CS Sedan Ardennes players
Angers SCO players
Lille OSC players
Stade Rennais F.C. players
Borgo FC players